Kristen Taunton (born June 27, 1977 in Richmond, British Columbia) is a former field hockey forward from Canada, who earned a total number of 118 international caps for the Canadian Women's National Team during her career.

She won a bronze medal, at the 1999 Pan American Games.

International senior tournaments
 1998 – Commonwealth Games, Kuala Lumpur, Malaysia (not ranked)
 1999 – Pan American Games, Winnipeg, Canada (3rd)
 2001 – Pan American Cup, Kingston, Jamaica (3rd)
 2001 – World Cup Qualifier, Amiens/Abbeville, France (10th)
 2002 – Commonwealth Games, Manchester, England (7th)

References

External links
 Profile on Field Hockey Canada

1977 births
Living people
Canadian female field hockey players
People from Richmond, British Columbia
Field hockey people from British Columbia
Field hockey players at the 1998 Commonwealth Games
Field hockey players at the 2002 Commonwealth Games
Commonwealth Games competitors for Canada
Pan American Games medalists in field hockey
Pan American Games bronze medalists for Canada
Medalists at the 1999 Pan American Games
Field hockey players at the 1999 Pan American Games